Qazdeh (also Romanized as Qāẕdeh; also known as Fāẕdeh and Ghāzdeh) is a village in Kasma Rural District, in the Central District of Sowme'eh Sara County, Gilan Province, Iran. At the 2006 census, its population was 242, in 61 families.

References 

Populated places in Sowme'eh Sara County